The Australia national handball team is the national handball team of Australia, representing the country in international matches.
Handball Australia is the national governing body for the Olympic Sport of Handball and for the sport of Beach Handball. Australia has consistently won the Oceania championships in both men's and women's division. In 2014 the International Handball Federation (IHF) decided to exclude Australia from the 2015 World Men's Handball Championship.

Tournament record

Olympic Games

World Championship

Oceania Nations Cup

Asian Championship

Pacific Cup

IHF Emerging Nations Championship

Kit suppliers

Team

Current squad
This is selected squad for the 2022 Asian Men's Handball Championship.

Head coach: Taip Ramadani

Notable players
Bevan Calvert
Darryl McCormack
Taip Ramadani
Lee Schofield
Ognjen Latinović
Milan Slavujević

Individual records

Coaches

Captains

Most matches played
Total number of international matches.

Most goals scored
Total number of international goals.

International matches
List of Australian national handball team games

Notes and references

Notes

References

External links

IHF profile

Handball in Australia
Men's national handball teams
Handball